Francisco Paesa (born in Madrid, Spain, 11 April 1936) is a Spanish former spy and businessman best known for his implication in several corruption scandals and the faking of his own death in the 1990s.

Biography
He began his business career conducting various businesses with Francisco Macías Nguema, the then dictator of Equatorial Guinea. In 1976 he was arrested by Interpol in Belgium and imprisoned in Switzerland and it is believed that he collaborated with the paramilitary group GAL.

Sokoa Operation
In 1986, after serving his sentence, he posed as an arms dealer who sold two antiaircraft missiles to ETA. The terrorist group did not know that the missiles had a location signal. The police could find at Henday in France during July 1986 and for the first time, a major hideout in which a large number of weapons and documents were stored. Until then, the Spanish government knew virtually nothing about ETA logistics  and this operation was an important turning point.

Judge Baltasar Garzón issued an arrest warrant for Francisco Paesa on 1 December 1988 for collaboration with armed mercenaries and the use of false identities.

Roldán
Luis Roldán, known for being the Director General of the Spanish Civil Guard during a massive corruption scandal in 1993, had said that Paesa tricked him into stealing all the money that Roldán had previously stolen in that case but the judicial case on the research to hide the heritage of Luis Roldán was filed in 2004, as the crime had prescribed.

Alleged death and later years
In 1998 he faked a fatal cardiac arrest in Thailand. Obituaries were published and a death certificate was forged. His family even commissioned thirty Gregorian Masses for his soul. The Spanish authorities believed that he had faked his death and he had escaped with two billion pesetas (given to him by Roldán).

He reappeared on Spanish media in 2004. He was mentioned as an organizer of an operation to overthrow Equatorial Guinea dictator Obiang with an army of mercenaries. 
Some say that Francisco Paesa was spotted by a detective agency in Barcelona, others in France and some in Luxembourg. However, everyone agreed that he had an Argentine passport with the name Francisco Pando Sánchez.

In December 2005, the magazine Interviú surprised him in Paris, where he was interviewed by director . He was 68 years old and his figure was impeccable. He explained that "his death" had been a misunderstanding, since it was reported that he was one of the three people who died in a shooting in Bangkok. He was willing to show the scars. As for the Russian mafia, he asked journalists to not publish the photos because that would force him to commit suicide.

In September 2016, the magazine Vanity Fair published an exclusive interview with Paesa. According to Paesa, his supposed death in Thailand was a misunderstanding; he was on an Anti-Terrorism commission from the Argentine Government when he was shot, wounded in action and taken to an unknown boat where he spent 7 months in a coma.

In fiction
The 2016 Spanish film Smoke & Mirrors is based on his life.

References

1936 births
Living people
Spanish spies
People from Madrid
People who faked their own death
People named in the Panama Papers